The Münsterland Giro is a cycling race annually held in Münsterland, Germany. It was first held in 2006 as a 1.2 race of the UCI Europe Tour, becoming a 1.1 race in 2007 and a 1.HC race in 2015. The race became part of the new UCI ProSeries in 2020.

Winners

External links
 Official website 

UCI Europe Tour races
Cycle races in Germany
Recurring sporting events established in 2006
2006 establishments in Germany
Münster (region)
Sport in North Rhine-Westphalia